Point Marion is a borough in Fayette County, Pennsylvania, United States. The population was 1,152 at the 2020 census, a decline from the figure of 1,159 tabulated in 2010. It is served by the Albert Gallatin Area School District.

History

Point Marion is located at the confluence of the Monongahela and Cheat rivers. Point Marion was settled in the mid-18th century and named in 1842 for its geographic location and Revolutionary War hero Francis Marion, the "Swamp Fox", a South Carolinian who never saw the town.

Houze Glass Co., located in the borough, was the primary employer. The company was founded by Leon Houze, a Belgian immigrant, in 1902 as a glassware manufacturer, but later branched into silkscreen printing and decorating. The company closed in 2004 and the plant was later auctioned off.

The Albert Gallatin Memorial Bridge across the Monongahela River was listed on the National Register of Historic Places as the Marion Bridge in 1988. It was demolished November 16, 2009, and replaced with a new bridge.

In November 2013, the town disbanded its two-man police department. The department's insurer dropped coverage after settling a case involving Officer Kevin Lukart. Lukart arrested a man who was recording the policeman. This resulted in a lawsuit and then the end of the policy. Lukart had been previously fired by the police in Apollo, Pennsylvania, after he was charged with exposing himself to a minor, and by police in Braddock, Pennsylvania, when he was filmed attacking a handcuffed man.

Geography

Point Marion is located near the southwestern corner of Fayette County at  (39.735711, -79.899698). It lies within the angle formed by the confluence of the Cheat and Monongahela rivers; the Cheat forms the northeastern boundary of the borough, and the Monongahela forms the western boundary as well as the border with Greene County.

U.S. Route 119 passes through the borough, crossing the Cheat River and leading northeast  to Uniontown, the Fayette County seat, and leading south  to Morgantown, West Virginia. Pennsylvania Route 88 crosses the Monongahela River leaving town and leads north  to Carmichaels.

Demographics

As of the census of 2000, there were 1,333 people, 572 households, and 374 families residing in the borough. The population density was 3,141.9 people per square mile (1,225.4/km2). There were 682 housing units at an average density of 1,607.5 per square mile (627.0/km2). The racial makeup of the borough was 99.10% White, 0.08% Native American, 0.08% from other races, and 0.75% from two or more races. Hispanic or Latino of any race were 0.60% of the population.

There were 572 households, out of which 28.1% had children under the age of 18 living with them, 48.1% were married couples living together, 11.7% had a female householder with no husband present, and 34.6% were non-families. 31.6% of all households were made up of individuals, and 15.6% had someone living alone who was 65 years of age or older. The average household size was 2.31 and the average family size was 2.87.

In the borough the population was spread out, with 22.3% under the age of 18, 6.8% from 18 to 24, 28.8% from 25 to 44, 21.8% from 45 to 64, and 20.3% who were 65 years of age or older. The median age was 40 years. For every 100 females, there were 102.0 males. For every 100 females age 18 and over, there were 95.5 males.

The median income for a household in the borough was $26,413, and the median income for a family was $36,989. Males had a median income of $27,439 versus $23,859 for females. The per capita income for the borough was $13,300. About 15.2% of families and 23.5% of the population were below the poverty line, including 34.7% of those under age 18 and 18.1% of those age 65 or over.

References

Populated places established in 1842
Pittsburgh metropolitan area
Boroughs in Fayette County, Pennsylvania
Pennsylvania populated places on the Monongahela River